The Ohel David Eastern Synagogue is a Sephardi Orthodox synagogue based in Golders Green, North London. Its members include Sephardi Jews from many parts of the world, especially Iraqi and other Mizrahi Jews.

History 
The synagogue was established in 1959. It was originally one of the synagogues that made up the Eastern Jewry Community, but is now independent.

The synagogue today 
The synagogue was led by Rabbi Abraham Gubbay until his death in July 2010. The present rabbi is Rabbi Asher Sebbag, and the hazzan is Mr J. Oved. The synagogue was significantly refurbished in 2001 by Ghassan Cohen and David Gigi. The President of the synagogue is Ghassan I. Cohen. Services take place daily in the main prayer room. There is a women's seating area separated from the men by a curtain, known in Hebrew as a mechitza. Shabbat services tend to finish at around 12 noon to 1 pm, depending on the time of year.

External links
Official website 
Ohel David Eastern Synagogue on Jewish Communities and Records – UK (hosted by jewishgen.org).

1959 establishments in England
Golders Green
Iraqi diaspora in Europe
Iraqi-Jewish diaspora
Jewish organizations established in 1959
Mizrahi Jewish culture
Orthodox Judaism in London
Orthodox synagogues in England
Religion in the London Borough of Barnet
Sephardi Jewish culture in the United Kingdom
Sephardi synagogues
Synagogues in London